This list of dinosaur specimens with documented taphonomic histories enumerates those fossil dinosaur specimens that have been subjected to focused efforts aimed at reconstructing the events following the animal's death and the processes by which its remains were preserved in the fossil record.

Ankylosaurs

Ankylosaurids

Nodosaurids

Ceratopsians

Psittacosaurids

Protoceratopsids

Ornithopods

Hadrosaurs

Theropods

Dromaeosaurs

Oviraptorosaurs

References

External links

Documented taphonomic histories